Gustave Moundi Djengue (born 16 February 1985) is a Cameroonian professional footballer who plays in Iraqi Premier League for Karbala club as a defensive midfielder.

Honours
 Finalist Nehru Cup 2012 with Cameroon
 Cameroon champion in 2012 with Union Douala

References

External links
 
 Gustave Moundi Djengue at  CAFonline
 Foreign Players in the Iraqi Premier League

1985 births
Living people
Association football defenders
Cameroonian footballers
Cameroon international footballers
Cameroonian expatriate footballers
Union Douala players
Expatriate footballers in Iraq
Cameroonian expatriate sportspeople in Iraq
Al-Kahrabaa FC players